Akçakocalı is a small village in Tarsus  district of Mersin Province, Turkey. At  it is situated in Çukurova (Cilicia of the antiquity) plains at the north bank of Berdan Dam reservoir. The population of Akçakocalı  is 74  as of 2011.

References

Villages in Tarsus District